Whitley County is the name of two counties in the United States:

 Whitley County, Indiana
 Whitley County, Kentucky